Li Yumei (born October 1956) is a Chinese politician who served as chairwoman of the Standing Committee of the Guangdong Provincial People's Congress from 2017 to 2022.

Li was an alternate member of the 17th and 18th Central Committee of the Chinese Communist Party. Li is a representative of the 19th National Congress of the Chinese Communist Party. Li was a delegate to the 12th National People's Congress and is a delegate to the 13th National People's Congress.

Biography
Li was born in Yinan County, Shandong, in October 1956. She entered the workforce in December 1974, and joined the Chinese Communist Party (CCP) in April 1976. During the late Cultural Revolution, she was a sent-down youth in her home-county. 

In 1991, she was promoted to become party secretary of Pingyi County, a position he held until 1995. In 1997, she was promoted to acting mayor of Linyi, confirmed in 1998. She was appointed party secretary of Laiwu in 2001, concurrently serving as chairwoman of its People's Congress. In 2006, she was elevated to vice governor of Shandong, but having held the position for only one year. She became a member of the Standing Committee of the CCP Shandong Provincial Committee in 2007 before being assigned to the similar position in southeast China's Guangdong province in 2010. In January 2017, she rose to become chairwoman of the Standing Committee of the Guangdong Provincial People's Congress, succeeding Huang Longyun.

On 28 February 2022, she was transferred to Beijing and appointed vice chairperson of the National People's Congress Overseas Chinese Affairs Committee.

References

1956 births
Living people
People from Yinan County
Central Party School of the Chinese Communist Party alumni
People's Republic of China politicians from Shandong
Chinese Communist Party politicians from Shandong
Mayors of Linyi
Alternate members of the 17th Central Committee of the Chinese Communist Party
Alternate members of the 18th Central Committee of the Chinese Communist Party
Delegates to the 12th National People's Congress
Delegates to the 13th National People's Congress